Murideva (Murideba) was a Dacian town in Scythia Minor, not far from Zaldapa.

See also 
 Dacian davae
 List of ancient cities in Thrace and Dacia
 Dacia
 Roman Dacia

References

Further reading 

Dacian towns
Ancient Bulgaria

ro:Dacian town